Stoops Hotel is a historic tavern and hotel located at Battenville in Washington County, New York.  It was built in two phases, with the oldest phase built between about 1790 and 1800. It is a timber-frame building of vernacular design with Federal and Greek Revival details.  It is located across from the Stoops Brinkman House and next to the Susan B. Anthony Childhood House.

It was listed on the National Register of Historic Places in 2009.

References

Hotel buildings on the National Register of Historic Places in New York (state)
Federal architecture in New York (state)
Greek Revival architecture in New York (state)
Hotel buildings completed in 1795
Buildings and structures in Washington County, New York
National Register of Historic Places in Washington County, New York